Jacqueline "Jackie" Neal (July 7, 1967 – March 10, 2005) was an American blues singer.

Career

Born in Baton Rouge, Louisiana, her parents were Shirley and Raful Neal. Her father was also a blues musician, as were eight of her ten siblings, including Kenny Neal.  She was best known for her hit singles "Right Thang, Wrong Man", "The Way We Roll" featuring her son Bro Bro, and "Down in the Club".

Death

She was shot and killed by her ex-boyfriend, James White, on March 10, 2005, in Baton Rouge, Louisiana. She was 37.

Discography

Albums
Blues Won't Let You Go (1995)
Lookin' for a Sweet Thang (2000)
Money Can't Buy Me Love (2002)
Down in da Club (2005)

References

External links

Jackie Neal featured on TV
 
 

1967 births
2005 deaths
2005 murders in the United States
American blues singers
Deaths by firearm in Louisiana
American murder victims
Musicians from Baton Rouge, Louisiana
People murdered in Louisiana
Murdered African-American people
20th-century American singers
Singers from Louisiana
20th-century African-American musicians